This is a list of members of Dáil Éireann, Seanad Éireann and Irish Members of the European Parliament who changed their party affiliation (that is abandoning a previous party membership to take up a new one) or who resigned from, were suspended from or were expelled from their previous party affiliation, making them independents. This list does not include the Ceann Comhairle, who resigns from their previous party affiliation on election to the position.

TDs who changed party affiliation

Senators who changed party affiliation

MEPs who changed party affiliation

See also
List of Dáil by-elections
List of Seanad by-elections

References

Ireland
Members of the Oireachtas
Lists of members of the Oireachtas